Bachia lineata is a species of lizard in the family Gymnophthalmidae. It is endemic to Venezuela.

References

Bachia
Reptiles of Venezuela
Endemic fauna of Venezuela
Reptiles described in 1903
Taxa named by George Albert Boulenger